Biuncaria kerzhneri is a species of moth of the family Tortricidae. It is found in China (Inner Mongolia) and Mongolia.

References

	

Moths described in 1972
Eucosmini